The Fort Smith Museum of History is located at 320 Rogers Avenue in Fort Smith, Arkansas.  The museum is devoted to presenting the history of Fort Smith and the surrounding region.  It is located near the Fort Smith National Historic Site in the former Atkinson-Williams Warehouse, built in 1906 and one of the city's oldest surviving commercial warehouse buildings.  The building, a large four-story brick building with typical early-20th-century commercial styling, was listed on the National Register of Historic Places in 1979.

See also
National Register of Historic Places listings in Sebastian County, Arkansas

References

External links

1910 establishments in Arkansas
Arkansas Heritage Trails System
History museums in Arkansas
Museums established in 1910
Museums in Sebastian County, Arkansas
Museums on the National Register of Historic Places in Arkansas
National Register of Historic Places in Sebastian County, Arkansas